Mariya Petrovna Maksakova may refer to:

Maria Maksakova Jr. (born 1977), Russian opera singer (mezzo-soprano), daughter of Lyudmila Maksakova
Maria Maksakova Sr. (1902–1974), Russian/Soviet opera singer (mezzo-sorprano)